The Centre for Scientific Research into Plant Medicine is an institution for research into herbal medicine in Mampong Akuapem, in the Eastern Region of southern Ghana. It was set up by the government of Ghana in 1976. It produces its own herbal medicines and runs an out-patient clinic which treats more than 16,000 patients a month.

References

Herbalism organizations
Medical and health organisations based in Ghana
Organizations established in 1975